Castel Bay is a Canadian Arctic waterway in the Northwest Territories. It is a southern arm of M'Clure Strait on northeast Banks Island. These bays are a part of Aulavik National Park.

It is named by Vilhjalmur Stefansson in honour of Arctic explorer Aarnout Castel.

References

Bays of the Northwest Territories
Banks Island